Alex Peter Traian Mateas (born March 28, 1991) is a former professional Canadian football offensive lineman who played for five seasons for the Ottawa Redblacks of the Canadian Football League (CFL). He was drafted by the Redblacks with the first overall pick in the 2015 CFL Draft. He won a Grey Cup championship with the Redblacks in 2016. He announced his retirement on July 5, 2021.

Mateas played college football at the University of Connecticut from 2012–2014 after redshirting at Penn State University in 2010. His father, Traian Mateaş is a retired soccer player and current youth coach at Ottawa TFC.

References

External links
Ottawa Redblacks bio

Living people
1991 births
Players of Canadian football from Ontario
Canadian football offensive linemen
UConn Huskies football players
Ottawa Redblacks players
Canadian people of Romanian descent
Canadian football people from Ottawa
Penn State Nittany Lions football players